James Edward Nottingham, Jr. (December 15, 1925 – November 16, 1978), also known as Sir James, was an American jazz trumpeter and flugelhorn player.

He was born in New York, United States, and started performing professionally in 1943 in Brooklyn with Cecil Payne and Max Roach. 

He served in the Navy in 1944-45, where he played in Willie Smith's band. It was while working with Lionel Hampton (1945–47), that he earned his reputation as a high-note player. Following this, in 1947 he worked with Charlie Barnet, Lucky Millinder (and again c. 1950), Count Basie (1948–50), and Herbie Fields. He played Latin jazz from 1951–53, and was hired by CBS as a staff musician in 1954. 

He worked for more than 20 years at CBS, and played jazz music in his spare time, co-leading a band with Budd Johnson (1962), and as a sideman with many orchestras, including those of Dizzy Gillespie, Oliver Nelson, Benny Goodman, Thad Jones/Mel Lewis (1966–70), and Clark Terry (1974-75). His only recordings as a leader were four songs for Seeco Records in 1957.

Jimmy Nottingham died in November 1978, at the age of 52.

Discography

As sideman
With Mose Allison
Hello There, Universe (Atlantic, 1970)
With Joe Cain
Latin Explosion (Time Records, 1960)
With Count Basie
The Count Basie Story (Roulette, 1960)
With Kenny Burrell
Blues - The Common Ground (Verve, 1968)
With Maynard Ferguson
The Blues Roar (Mainstream, 1965)
With Dizzy Gillespie
Afro (Norgran, 1954)
Dizzy and Strings (Norgran, 1954)
With Coleman Hawkins
The Hawk in Hi Fi (RCA Victor, 1956)
With Quincy Jones
Quincy Plays for Pussycats (Mercury, 1959-65 [1965])
With Jimmy McGriff
The Big Band (Solid State, 1966)
With Oliver Nelson
The Spirit of '67 with Pee Wee Russell (Impulse!, 1967)
With Chico O'Farrill
Nine Flags (Impulse!, 1966)
With Shirley Scott
For Members Only (Impulse!, 1963)
Great Scott!! (Impulse!, 1964)
Roll 'Em: Shirley Scott Plays the Big Bands (Impulse!, 1966)
With Sonny Stitt
Sonny Stitt Plays Arrangements from the Pen of Quincy Jones (Roost, 1955)
With Big Joe Turner
Boss of the Blues (Atlantic 1956)
Big Joe Rides Again (Atlantic 1960)

References

1925 births
1978 deaths
American jazz trumpeters
American male trumpeters
20th-century American musicians
20th-century trumpeters
20th-century American male musicians
American male jazz musicians